James Colgate may refer to:

 James Boorman Colgate (1818–1904), American financier
 SS James B. Colgate, a whaleback steamer